Columba McDyer (13 January 1921 – 18 September 2001) was a Gaelic footballer who played for Cavan and Donegal.

Playing career
McDyer was from Glenties, and played as a centre half-forward. He played with the Cavan team that won the 1947 All-Ireland Senior Football Championship Final at the Polo Grounds in New York City. This resulted in him becoming the first Donegal man to win an All-Ireland Senior Football Championship medal.

Following his success with Cavan, McDyer returned to Donegal and his native Glenties where he coached the Donegal senior team for a number of years. He also collected a Railway Cup medal with Ulster in 1942 and he also played in the same competition with Connacht.

Managerial career
McDyer managed Donegal. He was also an early influence on Jim McGuinness, Donegal's future All-Ireland winning manager. McGuinness described him as "an absolute gentleman to the fingertips, very well-educated… a very gentle, bubbly person".

Honours
McDyer was inducted into the Donegal Sports Star Awards' Hall of Fame in 1987.

References

1921 births
2001 deaths
Cavan inter-county Gaelic footballers
Donegal inter-county Gaelic footballers
Irish schoolteachers
People from Glenties
Ulster inter-provincial Gaelic footballers